The Dalifol was a French automobile manufactured only in 1896.  It was a horizontal-engined gas-driven car built by a firm best known for producing steam motorcycles.

See also
Dalifol & Thomas, manufactured from 1896 until 1898

References
David Burgess Wise, The New Illustrated Encyclopedia of the Automobile

1890s cars
Defunct motor vehicle manufacturers of France
Cars introduced in 1896